Deoli Assembly constituency is one of the 70 Delhi Legislative Assembly constituencies of the National Capital Territory in northern India.

Overview
Present geographical structure of Deoli constituency came into existence in 2008 as a part of the implementation of the recommendations of the Delimitation Commission of India constituted in 2002.
Deoli is part of South Delhi Lok Sabha constituency along with nine other Assembly segments, namely, Bijwasan, Sangam Vihar, Ambedkar Nagar, Chhatarpur, Kalkaji, Tughlakabad, Palam, Badarpur and Mehrauli.

Members of Legislative Assembly
Key

Election results

2020

2015

2013

2008

See also
Deoli, Delhi

References

Assembly constituencies of Delhi
Delhi Legislative Assembly